This list of mathematics awards is an index to articles about notable awards for mathematics. The list is organized by the region and country of the organization that sponsors the award, but awards may be open to mathematicians from around the world. Some of the awards are limited to work in a particular field, such as topology or analysis, while others are given for any type of mathematical contribution.

International

Americas

Asia

Europe

Oceania

See also

 Lists of awards
 Lists of science and technology awards

 
Mathematics